This is a list of awards and nominations Jed Madela has received during his career.

Awards

Voice of Asia

|-
|rowspan="3"| 2003 || Himself || Best Voice of Asia Male Singer of the Year 2003   || 
|-
|| Himself || People's Choice Award   || 
|-
|| Himself || Sponsor's Choice   ||

World Championships of Performing Arts

Myx Music Awards

|-
|2008 || Jed Madela || Favorite MYX Live Performance   || 
|-
|2018 || Jed Madela and Darren Espanto || Collaboration of the Year   || 
|-
|2018 || I’ll Be There by Jed Madela and Darren Espanto || Remake of the Year   || 
|-

Aliw Awards
(Philippines equivalent to People's Choice Award)

|-
|2008 || Himself || Hall of Fame   || 
|-
|2010 || Himself || Best Performance in a Concert (Male)   || 
|-
|2011 || Christmas at the Newport Performing Arts Theater || Best Major Concert (Male)   || 
|-
|rowspan="2"| 2012 || Beyond Expectations/CCP || Best Major Concert (Male)   || 
|-
|| Back to Basics/Music Museum || Best Performance in a Concert (Male)   || 
|-
|rowspan="3"| 2014 || Himself || Entertainer of the Year   || 
|-
|| Himself (10th Anniversary Concert) || Best Major Concert   || 
|-
|| Himself (All Requests 2) || Best Performance in a Concert (Male)   || 
|-
|rowspan="4"| 2016 || Himself (The Iconic Concert Series: Jed Madela Sings Celine/ Music Museum) || Best Performance in a Concert (Male) || 
|-

Awit Awards
The Philippine Awit Awards - About the Awit Awards (Philippines equivalent to Grammy Award)

|-
|rowspan="2"| 2008 || Hard Habit to Break featuring Gary Valenciano || Best Performance by a Duet   || 
|-
|| A Perfect Christmas || Best Christmas   || 
|-
|2010 || Songs Rediscovered 2: The Ultimate OPM Playlist || Best Selling Album of the Year   || 
|-
|rowspan="3"|2016 || Iconic: Didn't We Almost Have It All || Best Performance by a Male Recording Artist   || 
|-
|| Iconic: Sweet Love || Best Vocal Arrangement   || 
|-
|| Iconic: Somewhere Over The Rainbow duet with Ms. Regine Velasquez- Alcasid || Best Collaboration   || 
|-
|rowspan="4"|2017 || MMK 25 - Commemorative Album || Best Collaboration (with Darren Espanto)  || 
|-

Guillermo Mendoza Memorial Scholarship Foundation Box-Office Entertainment Awards

|-
|rowspan="2"| 2016 || Himself || Male Recording Artist of the Year   || 
|-
|| Your Face Sounds Familiar (ABS-CBN) || Most Popular TV Program Talent Search/Reality/Talk/Game Program   || 
|-

Wish 107.5 Awards

|-
|rowspan="2"| 2016 || Himself || Wish Male Artist of the Year   || 
|-
|| Iconic: You Mean The World To Me || Best WISHclusive Performance By A Male Artist   || 
|-

PMPC Star Awards For Music

|-
|rowspan="3"| 2009 || Songs Rediscovered 2: The Ultimate OPM Playlist || Male Recording Artist   || 
|-
|| Songs Rediscovered 2: The Ultimate OPM Playlist || Male Pop Artist of the Year   || 
|-
|| Songs Rediscovered 2: The Ultimate OPM Playlist ||  Revival Album of the Year || 
|-
|rowspan="5"| 2011 || The Classics Album || Male Recording Artist   || 
|-
|| I Believe || Music Video of the Year   || 
|-
|| The Classics Album ||  Male Pop Artist of the Year || 
|-
|| The Classics Album ||  Revival Album of the Year || 
|-
|| The Classics Album ||  Album Cover Design of the Year || 
|-
|rowspan="6"| 2012 || Breathe Again || Album of the Year   || 
|-
|| Breathe Again ||  Song of the Year || 
|-
|| Breathe Again ||  Male Recording Artist of the Year || 
|-
|| Breathe Again ||  Male Pop Artist of the Year || 
|-
|| Breathe Again ||  Revival Album of the Year || 
|-
|| Breathe Again ||  Album Cover Design of the Year || 
|-
|2013 || All Originals || Male Recording Artist of the Year   || 
|-
|rowspan="5"| 2016 || Iconic ||  Male Recording Artist of the Year || 
|-
|| Iconic ||  Revival Album of the Year || 
|-
|| Iconic ||  Design Cover of the Year || 
|-
|| All Requests 5 ||  Concert of the Year || 
|-
|| All Requests 5 || Male Concert Performer of the Year || 
|-
|rowspan="2"| 2018 || All About Love || Concert of the Year   || 
|-
|| All About Love || Male Concert Performer of the Year   || 
|-
|rowspan="4"| 2019 || Di Matitinag ||  Male Recording Artist of the Year || 
|-
|| Superhero ||  Album of the Year || 
|-
|| Higher Than High ||  Concert of the Year || 
|-
|| Higher Than High ||  Male  Concert Performer of the year || 
|-

Himig Handog

|-
|rowspan="2"| 2014 || If You Don't Want to Fall || Studio Readers Award   || 
|
|-
|| If You Don't Want to Fall || TFC's Choice Award   || 
|
|-

Gawad Musika Award

|-
|rowspan="2"| 2017 || Himself || Most Innovative Vocal Performing and Recording Artist  || 
|-

Laguna Excellence Award

|-
|rowspan="2"| 2018 || Himself || Outstanding Male Artist of the Year  || 
|-

Catholic Mass Media Awards

|-
|rowspan="2"| 2019 || Superhero || Best Album Secular Album  || 
|-

References

Madela